Philip Martelli Sr. (born August 31, 1954) is an American college basketball coach, currently the associate head coach for the Michigan Wolverines and the former head coach of the St. Joseph's Hawks. He led Saint Joseph's to seven NCAA Tournaments and six NIT appearances in 24 seasons as head coach.

Playing career
Martelli was a point guard for Widener University. As point guard, he was part of the NCAA Division III tournament teams in 1974-75 and 1975–76, and set the school's single season and career assist marks.

Coaching career

St. Josephs (1985-2019)
Martelli began his career on Hawk Hill with SJU's 1985-86 NCAA Tournament team. In his decade as an assistant, he was part of the Hawks' NIT teams in 1992-93 and 1994–95. After 10 years as an assistant under Jim Boyle and John Griffin, Martelli was named the 14th coach in school history on July 20, 1995, and just the third non-alumnus to coach the school.

In his first season as head coach (1995–96) his team reached the final game of the NIT Tournament. In his second year, under the floor generalship of Junior point guard Rashid Bey, and help from Arthur "Yah" Davis and Dmitri Domani, Martelli's Hawks captured the Atlantic 10 crown and made it into the Sweet Sixteen round of the NCAA tournament.

They would not duplicate that success until landing future Naismith College Player of the Year Jameer Nelson and former NBA players Delonte West and Dwayne Jones. With Nelson as point guard, Martelli led the 2003-04 Hawks to the greatest season in school history.  The Hawks went 27-0 regular season. The Hawks lost to Xavier in the Atlantic 10 Tournament, and reached the Elite Eight, ultimately losing to Oklahoma State to finish with a record of 30–2. This is "officially" the deepest run that St. Joseph's has ever made in the tournament; the 1960-61 team went all the way to the Final Four and won the third-place game, but that run was scrubbed from the books due to a gambling scandal. That year, Martelli was named Naismith College Coach of the Year.

In 2004–05, Martelli led the Hawks back to the final game of the NIT, where they lost to South Carolina. During the season, Martelli won his 235th game on Hawk Hill, passing Hall of Famer Jack Ramsay as the winningest coach in school history.

In 2005–06, the Hawks returned to the NIT, eventually losing to Hofstra University. In 2008, Martelli led Saint Joseph's to its first NCAA Tournament since 2004 with a team led by Pat Calathes and Ahmad Nivins. In 2014, the Hawks returned to the NCAA Tournament after winning their second Atlantic 10 Championship under Martelli, led by Langston Galloway, Ronald Roberts and Halil Kanacević. The Hawks went on to lose in overtime to the eventual 2013-14 National Champion Connecticut Huskies in the Second Round of the Tournament.

In 2007, Phil Martelli's first book Don't Call Me Coach: A Lesson Plan For Life was published. Students at SJU often say "In Martelli We Trust" about their beloved basketball coach. Martelli has a weekly show during the basketball season called Hawk Talk which discusses the standing of the university and the basketball team.

In October 2008, Martelli signed a contract extension at St. Joe's through the 2015–16 season. Martelli also surpassed Hawk legend Dr. Jack Ramsay for second among SJU coaches in wins 2008. Martelli has won the most postseason games of any Hawk coach and his teams.

In December 2011, Martelli was referenced in an article on SI.com in which former player Todd O'Brien detailed his side of a story about his former coach holding a grudge. O'Brien had applied for a graduate student waiver, where he was allowed to transfer to pursue a post graduate degree in a field not offered by their original institution, but SJU would not release him to play. The NCAA denied O'Brien's appeal and SJU was legally unable to comment on the details of the case. Martelli refused to honor O'Brien's request and kept him in his contract for undisclosed reasons.  Martelli was characterized by most reporters as being unreasonable about this for holding a grudge against O'Brien.

With a win against Morgan State in 2011, Martelli became the all-time winningest coach in Saint Joseph's history with his 310th victory.

Martelli has also lost more games than any coach in Saint Joseph's history, eclipsing Bill Ferguson's 208 losses in 25 seasons.  Martelli has lost 241 games in 18+ seasons at Saint Joseph's as of December 8, 2013.

Saint Joe's announced October 29, 2015 that Martelli received another contract extension (though the terms of the deal were not immediately released).< On March 13, 2016, Martelli claimed his second A-10 title in 3 years as the Hawks defeated VCU 87–74 in the 2016 Atlantic 10 Championship.

On March 19, 2019, Director of Athletics Jill Bodensteiner announced that the university had let go of Martelli, ending his 24-year tenure as head coach.

Michigan (2019-present)
On June 3, 2019, Martelli accepted a position as the associate head coach (second-in-command) at the University of Michigan. New Michigan head coach Juwan Howard, who had no experience coaching in college, asked Martelli to join his staff to provide college recruiting and game experience.

On February 22, 2022, Martelli was named as Michigan's interim head coach following Howard's suspension for the remainder of the 2021-22 regular season after he engaged in a physical altercation with Wisconsin coaching staff at the conclusion of a game between the two teams. He led Michigan to a 3-2 record with wins over rivals Michigan State and #23 Ohio State.

Personal life
Martelli is married to the former Judy Marra, who played on two national championship basketball teams at Immaculata College. In 2014, Marra's Immaculata teams were inducted into the Naismith Memorial Basketball Hall of Fame. 
Martelli is close friends with long time University of Connecticut women's basketball coach Geno Auriemma.

Head coaching record

Career highlights
 Atlantic 10 Coach of the Year (1997, 2001, 2004, 2005)
 Naismith College Coach of the Year (2004)
 Associated Press Coach of the Year (2004)
 2004 Adolph Rupp Cup
 2004 Chevrolet Coach of the Year
 2004 Henry Iba Award (USBWA)
 2004 NABC Co-Coach of the Year
 Head coach, Saint Joseph's University (1995–2019)
 Head coach, 2005 USA Basketball Under 21 World Championship Team
 NCAA berths: 1997, 2001, 2003, 2004, 2008, 2014, 2016

Notes

References

External links
 Saint Joseph's profile

1954 births
Living people
American men's basketball coaches
American men's basketball players
College men's basketball head coaches in the United States
High school basketball coaches in Pennsylvania
Michigan Wolverines men's basketball coaches
Place of birth missing (living people)
Point guards
Saint Joseph's Hawks men's basketball coaches
St. Joseph's Preparatory School alumni
Widener Pride men's basketball coaches
Widener Pride men's basketball players